Beiersdorf (Sorbian: Bejerecy) is a municipality in the district Görlitz, in Saxony, Germany.

Notable residents 
 The operatic tenor Werner Enders was born in Beiersdorf.

References 

Populated places in Görlitz (district)